Fort Morgan is the home rule municipality city that is the county seat and the most populous municipality of Morgan County, Colorado, United States. The city population was 11,597 at the 2020 United States Census. Fort Morgan is the principal city of the Fort Morgan, CO Micropolitan Statistical Area.

History

Fort Morgan

Camp Wardwell was established in 1865 along the Overland Trail to protect emigrants and supplies going to and from Denver and the mining districts. The fort was renamed in 1866 by General John Pope for one of his staff, Colonel Christopher A. Morgan, who had died earlier that year. The fort closed in 1868 after being used by 19 different companies from 11 cavalry and infantry regiments (about 1,300 soldiers).

Town

The town of Fort Morgan was platted just south of the old military fort's ruins on May 1, 1884, by Abner S. Baker, a member of Greeley's Union Colony. The town became the county seat of the newly formed Morgan County on February 19, 1889.

In World War II, a military school at the Fort Morgan State Armory was part of the West Coast Air Corps Training Center.

Geography

At the 2020 United States Census, the town had a total area of  including  of water.

Climate

Demographics

As of the census of 2000, 11,034 people, 3,887 households, and 2,736 families resided in the city. The 4,094 housing units averaged 917.2 per square mile (354.4/km). The racial makeup of the city was 74.43% White, 0.28% African American, 1.01% Native American, 0.18% Asian, 0.24% Pacific Islander, 20.62% from other races, and 3.24% from two or more races. Hispanics or Latinos of any race were 39.04% of the population.

Of the 3,887 households, 37.5% had children under the age of 18 living with them, 54.6% were married couples living together, 10.9% had a female householder with no husband present, and 29.6% were not families. About 25.6% of all households were made up of individuals, and 12.6% had someone living alone who was 65 years of age or older. The average household size was 2.79 and the average family size was 3.32.

In the city, the population was distributed as 30.2% under the age of 18, 9.6% from 18 to 24, 29.1% from 25 to 44, 18.1% from 45 to 64, and 13.1% who were 65 years of age or older. The median age was 32 years. For every 100 females, there were 100.4 males. For every 100 females age 18 and over, there were 97.6 males.

The median income for a household in the city was $33,128, and for a family was $36,134. Males had a median income of $27,667 versus $22,346 for females. The per capita income for the city was $15,024. About 8.9% of families and 12.9% of the population were below the poverty line, including 16.5% of those
under age 18 and 8.6% of those age 65 or over.

A map created by The New York Times shows that Fort Morgan citizens voted for Donald Trump in the 2020 United States presidential election over Joe Biden, ranging from 9.1 percentage points to 59 percentage points in favor of Trump. However, aside from the southeastern regions of Fort Morgan, the city voted more in favor of Biden than it did for 2016 Democratic candidate Hillary Clinton.

Economy
Fort Morgan, for the most part, has an agricultural economy.

Cargill operates a meatpacking plant. As of 2016, many of the employees at the plant were Muslims, many from Somalia.

Education

Higher education
Morgan Community College

Transportation

Rail 
Amtrak, the national passenger rail system, provides service through Fort Morgan, operating its California Zephyr daily in both directions between Chicago and Emeryville, California, across the bay from San Francisco.

Air  
Although the town is served by Fort Morgan Municipal Airport, no scheduled airlines operate from there, and the airport is purely for general aviation.

Major highways
To the northeast, Fort Morgan is linked with Interstate 80 in Big Springs, Nebraska, via Sterling, Colorado.
 Business Loop 76 runs parallel to Interstate 76, on Platte Avenue, reaching Brush in the east.
 U.S. Highway 34 runs east–west from Granby, Colorado, to Berwyn, Illinois, passing through Nebraska and Iowa. In Colorado, it connects Fort Morgan to Greeley and Loveland.
 State Highway 52 starts at Main Street Fort Morgan and goes north to State Highway 14, near New Raymer. It also serves Fort Morgan Municipal Airport.
 State Highway 144 runs northwest from downtown, eventually swinging south to meet Interstate 76 west of Wiggins.

Media

Newspaper
The city newspaper is the Fort Morgan Times.

Radio
KUNC 96.7 FM is a public-radio station from Greeley and Fort Collins that serves the Fort Morgan area as well.
KSIR 1010 AM and KRFD (FM) 94.5 have a broadcasting building in Fort Morgan. ABC 
KFTM  ("Hometown Radio") 1400 is a short-range AM radio station broadcasting in the city.

BOB FM 97.5 KSRX is a music station  from Sterling and Fort Morgan.
Numerous other radio stations from the region are accessible in Fort Morgan.

Notable people

Fort Morgan is the burial place of Philip K. Dick, where he was interred alongside his twin sister who died in early childhood.

Fort Morgan is the boyhood home of Big Band musician Glenn Miller. Miller went to high school in Fort Morgan and was known to have once played trumpet on top of Abner S. Baker School, since destroyed in a fire and now rebuilt, which at the time was the high school campus, but is now an elementary school.

Robert G. Whitehead (1916–2007) was born in Fort Morgan.

Joel Dreessen, former tight end for the Denver Broncos, grew up in Fort Morgan and attended Fort Morgan schools. He graduated from Fort Morgan High School in 2000.

Michael Crichton lived in Fort Morgan for a short time during World War II with his family when his father was drafted to serve in the war.

Sam Brunelli, football player.

Elvin C. Drake was head track and field coach for the 1956 NCAA Champion UCLA Bruins.

Ryan Jensen, center for the 2021 Super Bowl Champion Tampa Bay Buccaneers. Grew up in Fort Morgan and played football at Fort Morgan High School. Graduated in 2009.

Brenton Metzler is a TV producer. He moved to Fort Morgan at the age 16 and graduated from Fort Morgan High School in 1997.

See also

Colorado
Bibliography of Colorado
Index of Colorado-related articles
Outline of Colorado
List of counties in Colorado
List of municipalities in Colorado
List of places in Colorado
List of statistical areas in Colorado
Fort Morgan, CO Micropolitan Statistical Area

References

External links

City of Fort Morgan website
CDOT map of the City of Fort Morgan

 
Cities in Morgan County, Colorado
County seats in Colorado
Cities in Colorado